The 2016 European Baseball Championship was an international baseball tournament organized by Confederation of European Baseball. The 2016 European Championship was held from September 9 to 18, 2016 in Hoofddorp, Netherlands. It was organized by the Royal Dutch Baseball and Softball Association (KNBSB), the City of Hoofddorp and the local baseball club Hoofddorp Pioniers.

Qualification

The top ten teams of the 2014 European Championship qualified automatically for the tournament. 2 additional teams qualified from the B-level tournament. Qualification started on 29 July 2014 with C level qualifiers for B level tournament.

Round 1

Pool A

Standings

Source: www.baseballstats.eu

Schedule

 Source: www.baseballstats.eu

Pool B

Standings

 Source: www.baseballstats.eu

Schedule

 Source: www.baseballstats.eu

Round 2

Pool Winners

Standings

 Source: www.baseballstats.eu

Schedule

 Source: www.baseballstats.eu

Classification game

7th/8th place game

 Source: www.baseballstats.eu

Pool Losers

Standings

 Source: www.baseballstats.eu

Schedule

 Source: www.baseballstats.eu

Final

 Source: www.baseballstats.eu

Final standings

Awards
The CEB announced the following awards at the completion of the tournament.

Statistics leaders

Batting

* Minimum 2.7 plate appearances per game

Pitching

* Minimum 1.0 inning pitched per game

References

External links
CEB official site

 
European Baseball Championship
2016
European Baseball Championship
2016
European Baseball Championship